Parviz Sabeti (Persian: پرویز ثابتی; born March 25, 1936 Sang-e Sar) is an Iranian lawyer, former SAVAK top deputy under the regime of Mohammad Reza Pahlavi. He was in charge of SAVAK’s second division which was called “Surveillance and Pursuit” dept. the division of SAVAK that was mainly responsible for interrogating individuals. Born in Sang-e Sar, Semnan Province. Sabeti received a law degree from the University of Tehran and joined the SAVAK, Iran's intelligence agency in Shah's regime, in 1957, and quickly rose to become the acting director of the SAVAK's so-called third division, the Division of Surveillance and Pursuit, and later became its director.

He has been called one of the most powerful men in the last two decades of the Pahlavi dynasty. Historian Abbas Milani describes him as "like a character from a le Carré novel" and says that "As his fame and reputation grew, his name and face disappeared from the public domain."

Biography
Parviz Sabeti was born in 1936 into a Bahai family. However, his father lost his right to be part of the Bahai community, and Parviz Sabeti never became a practizing Bahai. He graduated from the Law School of the University of Tehran. He was initially hired as a judge in the Ministry of Justice. Having shown a keen interest in public policy and politics, he was recruited into the SAVAK, which was part of the Prime Minister's office, in 1959. This was a time when a new policy of introducing civilians into an organization staffed by primarily ex-military rank and file was introduced. Initially, he worked as a political analyst in the department of internal security and very soon became the head of political analysis where he was in charge of preparing and writing daily, periodical and special reports which went ultimately via the chain of command to the Shah of Iran.

Although Sabeti was philosophically against Marxism and radical Islam, he believed that arresting and prosecuting members of such groups should not be the only course of action. The cycle of actions and reactions of dissent, revolt, then crackdown would continue until the government, through substantial reforms, attempted to remove the roots of dissatisfactions and create more room for the participation of people in the political system.

Impressions by the Shah towards Parviz Sabeti had changed by the late 1970s when Sabeti, as the de facto security advisor to the Prime Minister and spokesman for the government, provided a long and impressive TV interview exposing the plots by the Iraqi regime of Saddam Hussein against Iran, with the collusion of internal enemies of the Shah. He continued to provide two more such interviews exposing the tactics of two major opposition groups, one Communist and one Islamic-Marxist.

None of this undid however the fact that he was the only civilian leader to have reached a leadership position at SAVAK, with the inevitable friction with the more hard-line, one dimensional attitude of those with a military background. One example being his differences with General Nassiri who was chief of SAVAK and deputy Prime Minister for 14 years. Nassiri who was a loyal soldier for the Shah, very often had clashes with Sabeti.

Sabeti and his family fled Iran after the Islamic Revolution in 1979. Pardis Sabeti, a Harvard biology professor, is his daughter.

References

External links

People from Semnan Province
People of SAVAK
1936 births
Living people
University of Tehran alumni
Iranian emigrants to the United States
Exiles of the Iranian Revolution in the United States
People of Pahlavi Iran